Ram Prakash Bambah (born 17 September 1925) is an Indian mathematician working in number theory and discrete geometry.

Education and career
Bambah earned a bachelor's degree from Government College University, Lahore, and a master's degree from the University of the Punjab, Lahore.
He then went to England for his doctoral studies, earning his Ph.D. in 1950 from St John's College, Cambridge under the supervision of Louis J. Mordell. Returning to India, he became a reader at Panjab University, Chandigarh, in 1952, and was promoted to professor there in 1957. Maintaining his position at Panjab University, he also held a position as professor at Ohio State University in the US from 1964 to 1969. He retired from Panjab University in 1993.

Bambah was president of the Indian Mathematical Society in 1969, and vice chancellor of Panjab University from 1985 to 1991.

Awards and honours
He was elected to the Indian National Science Academy in 1955.
In 1979 he was awarded the Srinivasa Ramanujan Medal, and in 1974 was elected to the Indian Academy of Sciences. In 1988 he received the Aryabhata Medal of the Indian National Science Academy and the Padma Bhushan award.

References

1925 births
Living people
20th-century Indian mathematicians
Indian number theorists
Geometers
Government College University, Lahore alumni
University of the Punjab alumni
Alumni of St John's College, Cambridge
Ohio State University faculty
Presidents of the Indian Mathematical Society
Recipients of the Padma Bhushan in science & engineering